The Master of Ozieri, identified by some scholars as Andrea Sanna, although his precise identity is not yet known, was an Italian painter from Sardinia and head teacher of a Mannerist movement born and developed in Logudoro during the first half of the sixteenth century, whose painting shows Spanish and Flemish influences. He was born and died in Ozieri in the sixteenth century.

He was the painter of the polyptych of the Madonna of Loreto preserved in the Cathedral of the Immaculate in Ozieri, organized in seven sections, and the pictorial cycle of the church of Sant'Elena in Benetutti.

References

Bibliography 
 
 
 
 

16th-century Italian painters
Ozieri